Sultana Daku ( Pakistani, Punjabi) is a 1975 film that was released on 12 December, 1975.

Cast 

 Sudhir as Sultana Daku, the film's title role
 Neelo as (Reshma)
 Nazli  as (Reetha)
 Munawar Saeed as (Ramoo)
 Veena  as (Gulabo)
 Ali Ejaz as (Karmu)
 Najma Mehboob as (Mother's of Sultana)
 Ashraf Khan as (Thanedar)
 Jaggi Malik as (Gopal Singh)
 Seema as (Prinder Kaur)
 Munir Zarif as (Comedy)
 Nouroz as (Thakkar's Child)
 Rehana Babri as (Supporting actress)
 Banka as (Thakkar Bansi)
 Meena Daud as (Nayika)
 Taya Barkat as (Sardar)
 Master Murad as (Sheeda)
 Adeeb as (Farangi)
 Rehan as (Farangi)
 Alauddin as (Thakkar)

Track listing

All film musical score was by G.A. Chishti and film song lyrics were by Waris Ludhianvi, Habib Jalib and Hassan Nisar.

References

External links
 

1975 films
1975 drama films
Films set in the British Raj
Pakistani biographical films
Pakistani crime films
Pakistani crime action films
Pakistani musical films
Punjabi-language Pakistani films
1970s Punjabi-language films